Let the Days Go By is the first studio album by  British singer-songwriter and guitarist Bryn Haworth, released in 1974 by Island Records.

The first song on the album "Grappenhall Rag" was also issued as a single by Island Records (b/w "I Won't Lie (This Time)", Cat No. WIP 6200).

Interviewed in 2009 about the reception given to the album, Haworth recalled: "It was quite positive actually. I think most of the music press found it quite fresh, you know. Back in those days there was an openness to all styles of music; it wasn't as narrow as it is now. And because it was a mix of songs and styles it seemed to please most people."

Track listing

Recording
Tracks 1, 2, 3, 4, 5, 9 and 10: March 1974, Island Studios, London
Producer: Bryn Haworth/ Richard Digby Smith
Engineer: Richard Digby Smith
Assistant engineer: Dave Hutchins

Tracks 7 and 8: October 1973, Island Studios, London
Producer: John Porter
Engineer: Phil Ault
("Get Yourself A Man" remixed by Richard Digby Smith)

Track 6: September 1973, Centre Music, Hollywood, California

Track 11: July 1973, Marshall's Ranch, Malibu, California
Engineer: Bryn Haworth

Musicians 

Bryn Haworth - Gibson mandolin (1,7,10), Gibson mandocello (1,5), harmonica (2), 12-string guitar (2,5), acoustic guitar, Harpolek (6), tambourine (7), Leslie slide guitar (7), acoustic slide guitar (7), 12-string slide guitar (11), electric guitars (2,3,8,9) and vocals (1-10)

Bruce Rowland - drums (1,3,4,5), rola-bola (5), marimbas (5), percussion (1)
Graham Maitland - Fender piano (1), Wurlitzer piano and accordion (4)
Gordon "Gordy" Haskell - bass (1,2,4,5,9,10)
Terry Stannard - drums (2,7,8,9,10)
Pete Wingfield - piano (2,10), Wurlitzer piano (8,10), grand piano (9)
Rabbit - Hammond organ (3)
Mel Collins - alto saxophone, horns (2,3)
Alan Spenner - bass (3)
Brian "Bugs" Pemberton - drums (6)
Freebo - fretless bass (6)
Kevin Kelly - Fender piano (6)
John Porter - bass (7,8)
Rick Wolff - Chinese flutes (10)
Mother Nature - crickets and ocean (11)

Other personnel 
Duncan Davis - photography
Michael Ross - Design (Lone Star Productions)

Packaging
The original cardboard inner sleeve for the vinyl record was printed, on both sides, with a multicoloured lotus petal mandala.

References

1974 debut albums
Bryn Haworth albums
Albums produced by John Porter (musician)
Island Records albums